Gary Robson (born 6 July 1965) is an English former professional footballer who played as a midfielder. Born in Chester-le-Street, County Durham, he played in the Football League between 1982 and 1996 for West Bromwich Albion and Bradford City, making nearly 300 league appearances.

Robson later played non-league football for Gateshead alongside brother Justin Robson. He went on to become Caretaker Manager of Gateshead, leaving the club after relegation. His other brother is former England captain Bryan Robson. Gary Robson (as of 2011) is Assistant Manager at Durham Alliance's Whitehill F.C.

External links
 
 Unofficial Gateshead Football Club Statistics Database

1965 births
Living people
Sportspeople from Chester-le-Street
Footballers from County Durham
English footballers
West Bromwich Albion F.C. players
Bradford City A.F.C. players
Gateshead F.C. players
Gateshead F.C. managers
English Football League players
Association football midfielders
English football managers